Ostodes is a genus of tropical land snails with gills and an operculum, terrestrial gastropod mollusks in the family Neocyclotidae (according to the taxonomy of the Gastropoda by Bouchet & Rocroi, 2005).

Species
Species within the genus Ostodes include:
 Ostodes adjunctus
 Ostodes artensis
 Ostodes bacageanus
 Ostodes brazieri
 Ostodes liberata
 Ostodes montrouzieri
 Ostodes plicatus
 Ostodes strigatus
 Ostodes upolensis

References

External links
 

Neocyclotidae
Taxa named by Augustus Addison Gould
Taxonomy articles created by Polbot